Down Low is a 2023 American comedy film, directed by Rightor Doyle, from a screenplay by Lukas Gage and Phoebe Fisher. It stars Gage, Zachary Quinto, Simon Rex, Sebastian Arroyo, Christopher Reed Brown, Audra McDonald, and Judith Light.

It had its world premiere at South by Southwest on March 11, 2023.

Plot

Cast
 Lukas Gage as Cameron
 Zachary Quinto as Gary
 Simon Rex as Buck/Fleshpuppet
 Sebastian Arroyo as Sammy/Looking2Succ
 Christopher Reed Brown as Raymond
 Audra McDonald as Patty
 Judith Light as Sandy

Production
In May 2021, it was announced Rightor Doyle would direct the film, from a screenplay by Lukas Gage and Phoebe Fisher, with FilmNation Entertainment set to produce. In October 2021, it was announced Gage, Zachary Quinto, Simon Rex, Audra McDonald, Judith Light and Sebastian Arroyo had joined the cast of the film.

Release
It had its world premiere at South by Southwest on March 11, 2023.

References

External links
 

2023 films
2023 LGBT-related films
2023 directorial debut films
American LGBT-related films
FilmNation Entertainment films